B. T. Road Government Sponsored Higher Secondary School or CIT School is a senior secondary boys' school in Kolkata district of West Bengal, India. Based on its performance of the students in the XIIth standard board examination, the school is considered one of the very best schools in West Bengal.

History
It was established in 1962 at "CIT campus" in Cossipore opposite Rabindra Bharati University. This institution is famous in name "CIT School".

Courses
Higher secondary section of this school offers Arts and Science streams.

Notable alumni
 Aritra Dutta Banik, actor

See also
 List of schools in Kolkata

References

External links

 B. T. Road Government Sponsored H. S. School on Facebook

High schools and secondary schools in West Bengal
Educational institutions established in 1962
Primary schools in West Bengal
Boys' schools in India
High schools and secondary schools in Kolkata
1962 establishments in West Bengal
Government schools in India
Day schools